Narendra Narayan Menon (born 7 January 1946 in Indore, Madhya Pradesh) is a former Indian first class cricketer. He is a right-handed batsman and wicketkeeper. He represented Madhya Pradesh cricket team in Ranji Trophy. He served as an international umpire during 1993–98. He officiated a total of four One Day Internationals. His son, Nitin Menon, is also an international umpire.

See also

 List of One Day International cricket umpires

References

External links
 NN Menon in Cricinfo

Living people
1946 births
Indian cricketers
Indian One Day International cricket umpires
Madhya Pradesh cricketers
Central Zone cricketers
Indian cricket umpires
Cricketers from Indore
Wicket-keepers